Danielak is a surname. Notable people with the surname include:

Jolanta Danielak (born 1955), Polish politician
Karol Danielak (born 1991), Polish footballer

Polish-language surnames